Fang Chengguo (14 December 1943 – 27 January 2009) was a Chinese senior banker, governor/president of the Bank of Communications, and vice-president of the Agricultural Bank of China.

Biography
Born in Zhenhai District, Ningbo, Zhejiang in December 1943, Fang joined the Communist Party of China in November 1963. 

Fang first worked as a clerk in the Shanghai Branch of the People's Bank of China. He was continuously promoted into the positions of deputy group leader, group leader, deputy director of the department.

Fang also worked in the Shanghai Branch of the Agricultural Bank of China, chronologically as the deputy director of the department, deputy director, director, assistant for the governor of Shanghai Branch, deputy governor of the Shanghai Branch, and finally the governor of the branch. Then he was transferred to the headquarters of Agricultural Bank of China in Beijing, eventually promoted as the deputy governor of the Agricultural Bank of China.  

Afterward, Fang worked in the Bank of Communications, first as its deputy governor, the deputy secretary (party position), and the member of the board. Then he became the governor of the Bank of Communications, the secretary-in-general, and the vice-president of the board.

References

1943 births
2009 deaths
Chinese bankers
Businesspeople from Ningbo
Agricultural Bank of China people
Bank of Communications people
Members of the 10th Chinese People's Political Consultative Conference